William Proctor is a former starting quarterback for the Clemson Tigers at Clemson University in the Atlantic Coast Conference in NCAA Division I-A, and for the Calgary Stampeders of the Canadian Football League. He attended Trinity Preparatory School. In 2003 at Clemson, as third-string QB, he saw the field in four games at wide receiver. He was the backup of Charlie Whitehurst until the 20062007 season. In his first start at Clemson, he recorded 232 yards of total offense against the Duke Blue Devils in 2005. In the 2006-2007 regular season, Proctor completed 60% of passes.

Proctor was playing as a backup quarterback for the Montreal Alouettes of the Canadian Football League for the 2007 CFL season and was released in the 2008 pre-season. He was then signed by the Calgary Stampeders in October, 2008.

In 2008, Proctor dressed for one regular-season game and both playoff contests for the Stamps. He won the Grey Cup with the Stampeders in 2008. In June 2009, Stampeders head coach/general manager John Hufnagel announced that Proctor has retired from football.

Personal life
Proctor married Fox & Friends host Ainsley Earhardt in 2012. He filed for divorce from Earhardt on October 10, 2018.

References

External links
Clemson University
Former Clemson quarterback playing in Canada
"STAMPS SIGN FOUR; PROCTOR RETIRES"
 

1983 births
Living people
Sportspeople from Winter Park, Florida
American football quarterbacks
Clemson Tigers football players
Canadian football quarterbacks
Montreal Alouettes players
Calgary Stampeders players
Trinity Preparatory School alumni
Players of American football from Florida
Players of Canadian football from Florida